Meatcake, or meatloaf cake, is a cake or other dessert look-alike that is made with meat in a meatloaf style, and not a pastry. Layers of meatloaf, baked in cake pans, are commonly "frosted" with mashed potatoes in classic layer cake fashion.

The term is used in a sketch by comedian George Carlin, in which he describes finding an unidentifiable item in the refrigerator.  "Could be meat, could be cake....  It looks like... meatcake!"  However, meatcake itself has occurred as a delicacy for quite some time before George Carlin.

See also
 Meatloaf
 Salisbury steak

References

External links
A Gallery of Meatcakes
A Meatcake Recipe

Meat dishes
American cuisine